Luis Coquis (1919–2011) was a Peruvian sports shooter. He competed in the 50 metre rifle, three positions and the 50 metre rifle, prone events at the 1956 Summer Olympics.

References

1919 births
2011 deaths
Peruvian male sport shooters
Olympic shooters of Peru
Shooters at the 1956 Summer Olympics
Place of birth missing